Kim Chang-Hun (born February 17, 1990) is a South Korean football player. He has represented South Korea at the U-22 level.

Club statistics

References

J. League (#19)

External links

1990 births
Living people
Association football defenders
South Korean footballers
South Korean expatriate footballers
J2 League players
Oita Trinita players
Ulsan Hyundai Mipo Dockyard FC players
Suwon FC players
Gimcheon Sangmu FC players
Korea National League players
K League 2 players
Expatriate footballers in Japan
South Korean expatriate sportspeople in Japan